Martina Suchá (born 20 November 1980) is a former professional tennis player from Slovakia.

On 22 April 2002, Suchá reached her career-high WTA singles ranking of No. 37.

She helped the Slovak team to win the 2002 Fed Cup, beating Nathalie Dechy of France in the quarterfinal.
She was also part of the Slovak 2004 Olympic Team.

WTA career finals

Singles (2 titles, 4 runner-ups)

ITF Circuit finals

Singles: 11 (5–6)

Doubles: 2 (2–0)

References

External links
 
 
 
 
 
 

1980 births
Living people
Slovak female tennis players
Olympic tennis players of Slovakia
Tennis players at the 2004 Summer Olympics
People from Nové Zámky
Sportspeople from the Nitra Region